Matilda or Maud FitzRoy may refer to:
Matilda FitzRoy, Duchess of Brittany, illegitimate daughter of Henry I of England by unnamed mistress
Matilda FitzRoy, Countess of Perche, illegitimate daughter of Henry I of England by Edith
Matilda FitzRoy, Abbess of Montivilliers, illegitimate daughter of Henry I of England by Isabel de Beaumont
Constance/Maud FitzRoy, Viscountess de Beaumont, illegitimate daughter of Henry I of England by unnamed mistress